A stencil is a template used to draw or paint identical letters, symbols, shapes, or patterns every time it is used. The design produced by such a template is also called a stencil.

It may also refer to:
 Stencil buffer, used in 3D computer graphics
 Stencil code, a class of algorithms
 Stencil graffiti, stencils used in street art
 Stencil (numerical analysis)
 Stencil (typeface), a font